Calvin Cheng Ern Lee is a Singaporean businessman and former Nominated Member of Parliament. Cheng is known for his views on socio-political issues in Singapore. He began his business career in the modeling industry and expanded into event hosting, publishing, and educational technology.

Education

Cheng earned his undergraduate degree in Philosophy, Politics and Economics at Hertford College, Oxford University. He later earned a master's degree in industrial relations. In 2017, he made a donation to Hertford to establish a prize for PPE students.

Business career 
Cheng was the Asia-Pacific head of Elite Model Management from 2001 to 2004.  During his tenure, he opened an Elite agency in India while developing other projects in the region. In 2004, Cheng set up Elite Models Singapore Pte Ltd. The company was renamed Looque Models Singapore Pte Ltd in 2005.  Through Looque he ran several franchising businesses in the fields of luxury events, media, and talent management in entertainment and business. Cheng ran Ford Models Supermodel of the World competitions under license from Ford in China in 2007 and in Malaysia in 2011. The World Economic Forum named Cheng a Young Global Leader in 2009.

On 23 November 2011, several model agencies, including Looque Models, were fined for price fixing. Cheng claimed in defense that the goal was to raise wages for models. The Competition Commission of Singapore (CCS) ruled that Association of Modelling Industry Professionals Singapore (AMIP) engaged in anticompetitive price-fixing, resulting in customers paying more and having a considerable and adverse impact on the market. The CCS noted in its decision that as president of AMIP, Cheng played a central role by instructing AMIP members how to mask the collusion to evade detection and complaints. Cheng appealed, claiming that statements in the decision were damaging to his character. The appeal was dismissed because he had not been personally fined.

In August 2015, Cheng merged one of his franchise businesses, Lumina Looque Knowledge Hubs Pte Ltd, with a Chinese firm called ReTech that focused on educational technology, and led the company to IPO on the Australian Stock Exchange in June 2017.

In May 2022, Dubai's Virtual Assets Regulatory Authority awarded a provisional virtual asset license to Cheng's company Web3 Holdings FZE.

In February 2023, Cheng's digital asset management company, Damoon Technologies, which allowed fiat money to cashless transactions and vice-versa, was officially given regulatory approval by FINMA, Switzerland’s financial services watchdog.

Government roles 
In July 2009, Cheng was appointed to a   year term as a Nominated Member of Parliament in Singapore's 11th Parliament.  As NMPs are supposed to reflect nonpartisan views, the newspaper Today questioned his appointment in light of his membership in Young PAP. Cheng resigned from Young PAP shortly thereafter. His term as an NMP ended after 21 months when Parliament was dissolved during the general elections.

In 2012, Cheng was appointed to the newly formed Media Literacy Council (MLC) of Singapore's Ministry of Communications and Information, which was created to "promote civility and responsibility on the Internet".  He served two two-year terms on the MLC.

In November 2022, the prime minister of Serbia appointed Cheng as the first honorary consul of Serbia to Singapore to establish closer ties with the country. Prior to his appointment, Serbian interests would seek assistance from Singapore ambassadors based in Jakarta, Indonesia.

Socio-political views 
Cheng often posts his views on socio-political issues in Singapore on Facebook, and is known for attracting controversy at times for his outspoken views.

In November 2015, while he was on the Media Literacy Council, Cheng advocated for the killing of children of terrorists on the Facebook page of entrepreneur and commentator Devadas Krishnadas. His comments led to a verbal warning from Tan Cheng Han, the Chairman of the MLC. Cheng apologized to the MLC.

Amos Yee, a teenager who had been previously jailed for comments offensive to the Singaporean government, was convicted and jailed in 2016 for "hurting religious feelings" in his online responses to Cheng's Facebook posts. In March 2017, a United States judge granted Yee political asylum, citing the different ways that Cheng and Yee had been treated, where Cheng was not charged, and Yee was charged and convicted.

References

1975 births
Living people
Singaporean Nominated Members of Parliament
Singaporean businesspeople
Alumni of Hertford College, Oxford
Singaporean people of Chinese descent